The U.S. Open Beer Championship is an international brewing competition. The event, which is open to professional breweries and award-winning home brewers, is held in late June, with the winners announced in July.

Over 140 styles of beer are judged. Winners receive a medal in the shape of a beer stein for 1st, 2nd, or 3rd place. Beers placing in the top 10 of each category and in the top 10 breweries overall are featured on BeerInfo.com. A Grand National Champion is awarded based on a point system for beers (5 minimum) entered in the competition.

This was the first beer judging to be started by former and current brewers and is the only professional competition to allow homebrewers. Every year, the gold medal winners of the National Homebrewers Competition get invited to compete against the pros.

Grand national champions:
 2009 - Deschutes Brewing – Bend, Oregon
 2010 - Maui Brewing - Hawaii
 2011 - Deschutes Brewing – Bend, Oregon
 2012 - Sweetwater Brewing - Atlanta, Georgia
 2013 - Capital Brewery - Middleton, Wisconsin
 2014 - Wormtown Brewery - Worcester, Massachusetts
 2015 - Ballast Point Brewing - San Diego, California
 2016 - Firestone Walker Brewing - Paso Robles, California
 2017 - Cherry Street Brewing - Cumming, Georgia
2018 - Peticolas Brewing Company - Dallas, Texas
2019 - Sun King Brewery - Indianapolis, Indiana
2020 – Deschutes Brewery – Bend, Oregon
2021 - Toppling Goliath Brewing - Decorah, Iowa 
2022 - Sun King Brewery - Indianapolis, Indiana

References 

 U.S. OPEN BEER CHAMPIONSHIP’S GRAND NATIONAL CHAMPION & MEDAL WINNERS.  All About Beer Magazine, July 11, 2016^
 US Open Beer Championship announces top American breweries.  Fox News, July 11, 2013^ 

Specific

Beer festivals in the United States
Annual events in the United States